Masaryk is a Czech surname. Notable people with the surname include:

 Alice Masaryk (1879–1966), Czech sociologist and one of the founding members of the Czechoslovak Red Cross, the daughter of Tomáš Garrigue Masaryk
 Charlotte Garrigue Masaryk, American-born wife of Tomáš Garrigue Masaryk
 Fritzi Massary (1882–1969, born Massaryk), Austrian-American soprano singer and actress
 Herbert Masaryk (1880–1915), Czech painter, the son of Tomáš Garrigue Masaryk
 Jan Masaryk (1886–1948), Czech diplomat and politician, the son of Tomáš Garrigue Masaryk
 Pavol Masaryk (born 1980), Slovak football striker
 Tomáš Garrigue Masaryk (1850–1937), Czech statesman in Austria-Hungary and Czechoslovakia, sociologist, philosopher, and the first President and founder of Czechoslovakia

Fictional characters
 Milos Masaryk, the first supervillain with codename Unicorn from Marvel Comics in Unicorn (Marvel Comics) series

See also 

Czech-language surnames